David Patrick Tyndall Jr. (3 March 1917 – 30 June 2006) was an Irish businessman. He started out in a family business with his eponymous father and eldest brother William, and played an important role in helping modernise the wholesale and retail grocery trade, consolidate it, and enable the family grocery shop owner adapt to the advent of supermarkets. He also played a key role at the head of several business organisations, was a world traveller and amateur pilot, who also featured in the Guinness Book of Records as the oldest man ever to fly a helicopter solo.

Family background
He was a son of Sarah (née Gaynor) and David P. Tyndall (Sr.).  He married Molly (née Kettle) in September 1949, and they had four children: Mona, Mary, Pauline and Vivian.

Career in business
He was known for his keen sense of opportunity and strategic vision, and his success at mergers and acquisitions earned him the nickname "Take-over Tyndall" in Irish business circles. Known as a caring employer, he absorbed many of the employees of wholesalers who closed down (Hugh, Moore & Alexander, Shirley Spence & Belford, McMaster, Hodgson, R. Jones & Co.), and introduced a bonus incentive scheme, and a scheme of non-contributory pensions for all employees. He lay behind the first initiative of an Irish wholesale group to establish a bonded warehouse to expand their wine & spirits business.

After his father's retirement, and in close collaboration with his older brother William, he expanded the Tyndall interests to include retail stores, through joint ventures for self-service stores across Ireland.  Their reputation for honesty and loyal relationships with banks and insurance companies guaranteed them support in times of need, such as when damages were incurred due to floods or fire, etc.  They successfully resisted a 25% takeover bid by Irish businessman Tony O'Reilly in 1971. Eventually they sold AWL to Joshua Watson Ltd., and Dave joined its board. It was later taken over by Irish Distillers, who were later taken over in 1988 by Pernod-Ricard.

The Tyndall brothers continued to maintain their other interests, William retired in 1980 and Dave retired in 1984, after fifty-one years in the grocery business.

Aviation interests
Dave's aviation interests included an active involvement (President) with the Leinster Aero Club, currently based in TREVET (EITT), near Dunshaughlin, Co. Meath. The Leinster Aero Club was founded in 1956 and originally based at Weston Aerodrome. In 1964, the club re-located to Dublin Airport, where it existed until relocating back to Weston in 2004. In 2006, the club moved to Trevet Airfield, a newly licensed field near Dunshaughlin, Co. Meath. There are over 50 members in the club ranging from SPLs, PPLs, CPLs, ATPLs and Instructors. The club has a proud history of success stories – several members have gone on to become professional pilots with various airlines around the world.

Companies founded, with his father and brother
Doherty, Tyndall & Co. Ltd.
D. Tyndall & Sons, Ltd.(Director & Secretary)
Farm Sales, Ltd. (Director)
Creamery Packers, Ltd. (Member)
Efficient Distribution, Ltd. (Golden Goose Stores)(President)
SPAR Ireland Ltd. (Director)
Cameron Markets, Ltd. (Chairman & managing director)
Park Markets, Ltd. (Chairman & managing director)
Greenhills Produce, Ltd. (Chairman & managing director)
Phoenix Markets, Ltd. (Chairman & managing director)

Mergers and acquisitions
National Packers, Ltd.
Sugar Distributors, Ltd. (Director)
Brightside Engineering, Ltd. (Director)
Amalgamated Wholesalers, Ltd. (AWL) (Chairman & managing director)
McArdle & Lalor, Ltd.
Moore Investments Ltd. (Director)
Carton Bros. Co.
Lee & Co.
MNC (Merchants National Coop)
MUM Cash & Carry
MACE franchise stores
Gilmores
Brooks Watson Group, Ltd. (Director)
B.W.G. Foods Ltd. (Chairman & managing director)
B.W.G. Trading (Chairman)

Business associations co-founded
RG Data – Retail Grocery, Dairy and Allied Trades
Irish Association of Distributive Trades (I.A.D.T.)(Member)
Wholesale Grocers Association of Ireland (President)
Irish Grocers Benevolent Association/Fund (President)

Aviation interests and positions
Leinster Aero Club Ltd., President
Aircraft Owners & Pilots Association, Treasurer
Irish Aviation Council Ltd., Treasurer

Other interests and positions held
St. Joseph's Hospital, Vice-Chairman
Legion of Mary, President of a Praesidium
St. Gabriel's Parish Committee, Chairman
Swords Family Care Ltd., Chairman
National College of Industrial Relations, committee member
Thorndale Lawn Tennis Club, committee member

Biographical references
Flying high...at 83 – David is World's Oldest Copter Pilot, article by Martina Devlin, Irish Independent, Dublin, 22 July 2000.
Flying in the face of convention, article on David Tyndall by Olive Keogh, published in Irish Times, Dublin, 20 April 2002.

External links
Guinness Book of Records Guinness World Records
RG Data 
SPAR Ireland

Background references
Tyndall manuscript genealogies: see MS. vols. F.3.23, F.3.27, F.4.18 in Trinity College Library, Dublin
The Book of Dignities, by Joseph Haydn, 3rd edition, W.H. Allen & Co., London, 1894.
Fairbairn's Book of Crests of Families of Great Britain and Ireland, by James Fairbairn, (2 Vols.)T.C. & E.C. Jack, London, 1905.
Prerogative Wills of Ireland (1536–1810) – Index, by Sir Arthur Vicars, Dublin, 1897.
A Genealogical and Heraldic History of the Commoners of Great Britain and Ireland, by John Burke, London, 1838.
A Guide to Irish Country Houses, by Mark Bence-Jones, Constable & Co.Ltd., London, 1988. (pages 19 and 41).
Dublin Almanacks, 1830, 1840, 1860.

1917 births
2006 deaths
Businesspeople from County Dublin
20th-century Irish businesspeople